The Gulf of Piran or Piran Bay is located in the northern part of the Adriatic Sea, and is a part of the southernmost tip of the Gulf of Trieste.

Overview
It was named after the town of Piran, and its shores are shared by Croatia and Slovenia.

On the eastern Slovenian coast lies the town of Piran, and the settlements Portorož and Lucija. On the southern Croatian coast are tourist camps of Crveni Vrh and Kanegra, built in the 1980s. The main river flowing into the gulf is the  Dragonja, whose mouth is on the border.

The Gulf area has been a theatre of a maritime and land border dispute between Slovenia and Croatia.

External links
 Conditions in the Gulf of Piran - graphs, in the following order, of water temperature, wave height, wave (interval) period, wave direction, current speed, current direction, maximum wave height data for the past 30 days (taken near Piran by ARSO)

Gulfs of Croatia
Gulfs of Slovenia
Disputed waters
Territorial disputes of Croatia
Territorial disputes of Slovenia
Croatia–Slovenia border
Gulf
Adriatic Sea